WCW refers to World Championship Wrestling, a defunct American professional wrestling promotion.

WCW may also refer to:

World Championship Wrestling (Australia), a defunct Australian professional wrestling promotion
Witchcraft Works, a manga and anime series 
William Carlos Williams (1883–1963), American poet 
The World Can't Wait, left-wing protest group 
Whitechapel Computer Works, a computer company 
What Chilli Wants, a VH1 reality show
NEW (TV station), which had the pre-launch callsign of WCW

See also
World Wrestling Championships